Her Reputation may refer to:
 Her Reputation (1931 film), a British comedy film
 Her Reputation (1923 film), a silent film drama